Mike Bernard may refer to:
 Mike Bernard (musician) (1875–1936), American musician
 Mike Bernard (painter) (born 1957), English painter
 Mike Bernard (footballer) (born 1948), English footballer
 Michael Bernard (born 1948), American basketball coach